Woods of Terror is an American haunted house theme park on North Church Street, Greensboro, NC 27455.

History 
Woods of Terror sits on 45 acres of land 12 miles outside of Greensboro, North Carolina. The land is said to be the permanent home to countless spirits who died during The Great Depression. At the time, local priest, Father Eddie Howie McMillan, was the owner of this land. He passed it on to his great-grandson, Eddie Howie McLaurin, in 1970. It became known as McLaurin Farms. McLaurin used the area as a junkyard, collecting fees from individuals who would dump their unwanted belongings, ranging from refrigerators to cars. These items remain as a part of the set used by Woods of Terror. The park opened in 1991.

Attractions
Woods of Terror offers a variety of attractions before patrons even enter the woods. Just beyond the ticket booth lies "The Monster Midway" which is the epicenter and waiting area of Woods of Terror. When he is in the Midway, Eddie McLaurin is affectionately known as "Bone Daddy" accompanied by his signature red mohawk and half-skeleton face makeup. Bone Daddy leads the monster parade to commence the night of haunts. Soon thereafter, Bone Daddy sings the National Anthem in a punk rock style accented by fireworks and a head-banging band. In the Midway, patrons can enjoy refreshments and photo opportunities. The fan favorite photo op is with Bone Daddy himself and his 80-pound albino Burmese python named Dawn who gets draped over the shoulders of guests who dare approach.

Woods of Terror features 12 bone-chilling attractions. "Arachnophobia" is designed to exploit fears of creepy crawlers such as spiders, roaches, and snakes. "Chaos 3D" allows guests to get dizzyingly close to three-dimensional murals. After donning 3D glasses, guests must traverse halls filled with visual illusions. Other experiences include "Industrial Nightmare," "The Blood House," "Horror Movie Classics," "The Awakening," "Miner's Massacre," "The Slaughter House," and "The Purge Anarchy." Approximately 175 employees make the production a success year after year.

McLaurin Farms 
Woods of Terror is not the only seasonal attraction that is housed at McLaurin Farms. In addition to Woods of Terror, McLaurin Farms has a large pumpkin patch during autumn. Shortly after the screams have died down, wintertime brings an elaborate Christmas lights display set to music. Patrons can enjoy the show while on a hayride. Springtime brings new excitement with an annual Easter egg hunt along with face painting.

References

Amusement parks in North Carolina
Buildings and structures in Guilford County, North Carolina
Tourist attractions in Guilford County, North Carolina